Vaeakau-Taumako (formerly known as Pileni) is a Polynesian language spoken in some of the Reef Islands as well as in the Taumako Islands (also known as the Duff Islands) in the Temotu province of the Solomon Islands.

The language is spoken throughout the Taumako Islands, while in the Reef Islands, it is spoken on Aua, Matema, Nifiloli, Nupani, Nukapu, and Pileni. Speakers are thought to be descendants of people from Tuvalu.

Vaeakau-Taumako was described by linguists Even Hovdhaugen and Åshild Næss, in the form of a dictionary and a grammar.

Classification
Vaeakau-Taumako is a Polynesian outlier. Within that group, it has traditionally been considered one of the Futunic branch, but a 2008 study (exclusively based on lexical evidence) concluded that this membership is weakly supported.

Phonology

Vowels

Vaeakau-Taumako does not vary from the standard Polynesian and Austronesian vowel system, featuring five vowels that can be used either in a long or short form. Short vowels found in word-final syllables are frequently devoiced or dropped, but long vowels in the same position are always stressed. There is little allophonic variation between vowel pronunciations.

Vowel sequences in Vaeakau-Taumako are typically not treated as diphthongs, as they are not fully reduplicated, as shown in the word "holauhola". This is despite the vowels in the original word being pronounced like a diphthong.

Consonants

The Vaeakau-Taumako language has one of the most complex consonant system of the Polynesian languages, with 19 distinct phonemes, plus a large amount of variation across dialects. /b/ and /d/ are found primarily in loan words, rather being native to the language.

Aspirated sounds are characteristic of the language, and are typically strong and audible. However, the use of aspirated sounds varies across dialects, enough that it is difficult to identify a consistent pattern aside from noting they always occur at the start of stressed syllables.

Morphology

Pronouns
Vaeakau-Taumako pronouns distinguish between 1st, 2nd and 3rd person pronouns. There are some inclusive and exclusive distinctions, and variations for singular, dual and plural in all cases. There are no gender distinctions. There is variation in the pronoun system for the dialects of Vaeakau-Taumako which can become quite complex, so for simplicity, only the general forms are recorded here.

Independent personal pronouns
There are two distinctive base sets of independent personal pronouns in Vaeakau-Taumako. The standard forms are used for formal occasions and recorded text, while the colloquial forms are typically found in informal, everyday conversation.

Bound subject pronouns
The language also features bound subject pronouns which act as clitics to the tense-aspect-mood marker of the verb of the constituent. They are not obligatory to use. The presence of the "u" has free variation by the choice of the speaker, but they are typically less prevalent in the colloquial forms.

Hortative pronouns
The dual, plural and 2nd person singular have specific pronouns used in imperative and hortative sentences.

Emphatic corefential pronouns
When the subject and direct object of a sentence are the same thing, repetition of the independent pronoun in place of both argument positions is typically used. However, there is a set of emphatic coreferential pronouns used for the direct object to refer to someone or a group of people acting alone.

The general pronoun nga
The word nga functions as a pronoun with specific use. It is a third person pronoun, but lacks specification for number, and is used to refer to both singular and plural referents. It typically is an anaphoric reference to a previously mentioned referent.

Possession

Control 
While it is common for Polynesian languages to distinguish between alienability and inalienability with a and o possessives, this is not the case for Vaeakau-Taumako. This distinction exists, however it instead marks control – not of the possessed item itself, but of the possessive relationship.

A-possessives 
Relationships that can be initiated or terminated freely, such as items that can be bought, sold or given away at will are marked with the a-possessive.

O-possessives 
Relationships that are outside of the possessor's personal control, such as body parts and kinship relationships are marked with o-possessives.

Alienability and inalienability 
Instead of a- and o- possessives, alienability and inalienability in Vaeakau-Taumako are distinguished by the use of either prenominal or postnominal possessive pronouns.

Prenominal possessive pronouns 
Prenominal possessive pronouns occur directly preceding the possessed nouns, and are typically used for inalienable relationships, such as kinship terms and body parts. Prenominal possessive pronouns distinguish between singular, dual and plural of the possessor. The singular possessive forms make an additional distinction between singular and plural of the possessed entity, and encode the a- or o-possessive directly. The dual and plural possessor forms are combined with the possessive prepositions a and o to express this distinction, or they may occur without a preposition.

Postnominal possessive pronouns 
The postnominal possessive pronoun succeeds the possessed noun, and are used to mark alienable relationships, such as owned items. They make no distinction between singular and plural of the possessed item, instead the distinction is usually made through the choice of article preceding the possessed noun. Like with prenominal possessive pronouns, the postnominal possessives are based on the possessive prepositions a and o, plus a pronominal form indicating person and number of the possessor. In the singular form, this is the same set of suffixes found on the prenominal possessives, whereas in the dual and plural form, a distinct set of person and number forms are found. In the third and first person, these forms are identical to the independent personal pronouns, except for the lack of aspiration on the initial consonant.

Possessive Suffixes 
The possessive suffixes -ku  (1st person), -u (2nd person) and -na (3rd person) apply to a restricted set of kinship nouns: tama/mha 'father', hina 'mother', thoka 'same-sex sibling', thupu 'grandparent', and mokupu 'grandchild'. These nouns cannot occur without possessive marking, they require either a possessive suffix or, in the dual and plural, a postnominal possessive pronoun. An alternative construction is for these nouns to take the 3rd person possessive suffix -na in combination with a prenominal possessive pronoun or possessive prepositional phrase. The form in -na must in such cases be understood as a neutral or unmarked form, since it may combine with a pronoun of any person and number; but a form in -na without any further possessive marking is unambiguously 3rd person. Nouns other than those previously mentioned do not take possessive suffixes, but instead combine with possessive pronouns.

Negation

Vaeako-Taumako displays negation in prohibitions (prohibitive, irrealis, imperfective, admonitive), statements (verbal and non-verbal) polar questions and noun phrases. Negation morphemes behave similarly to verbs in many respects although they do not take tense-aspect-mood markers or form independent predicates. However, there are instances of their taking complement clauses and for this reason negation morphemes might be considered a sub-class of verb.

Prohibition 

Prohibitive clauses may be divided into two. Prohibitive auā, (equal to the English 'don't') and Admonitive na. Prohibitives pattern themselves in similar ways and are most frequently positioned cause initially. Admonitives behave and distribute slightly differently as will be illustrated below.

Negated clauses appear with only a small range of tense-aspect-mood markers. Prohibitive clauses often display no tense-aspect-mood marker at all, if they do, the markers are either na irrealis or me prescriptive. Negated declarative clauses typically occur with either perfective ne or imperfective no, with other options only marginally represented in collected data.

Prohibitive auā 

auā appears clause-initially, however discourse particles such as nahilā ('take care, make sure') may precede it. Other grammatical morphemes such as articles or markers of tense, aspect or mood may not precede it which excludes auā from the verb category of Vaeakao-Taumako.

However, auā behaves like a verb in that it may take clausal complements, which are then often either nominalised or the irrealis marker na is present (see table 1.1.3).
A correlation exists between singular 2nd person subject and a nominalised clause although this correlation is not absolute.

Contrasting this, the 2nd person dual or plural subjects attract the irrealis marker na to create a prohibitive clause.

Within data sets of Næss, A., & Hovdhaugen, E. (2011), as implied by the imperative nature of the morpheme, auā  will tend to appear with 2nd person subjects as above, although both 1st and 3rd subjects are also found.

1st Person

3rd Person

Auā  is also found in conjunction with modifiers such as ala which marks a hypothetical or oki, 'back, again'.

auā-ala

auā - oki

Irrealis na and Imperfective no 

Irrealis na and imperfective no adheres to a common pattern of appearing in 2nd person in dual or plural within prohibitive clause structure.

Instances of 3rd person are less frequent and tend to include the imperfective no in postposition to morpheme auā.

Admonitive na 
na behaves similarly to aluā only in that it is clause initial, it is otherwise classified as a clause initial particle and it must be accompanied by the tense-aspect-mood marker me  which acts as a prescriptive.

However na also has a second function, it acts to point out the consequences of disobeying the order. In this role the na often appears without me, creating a clause without tense-aspect-mood marking.

Statements

Verbal Clause Negation 

Verbal negation is made up of three morphemes which act independently and may be understood as the English equivalents to siai 'not', sikiai 'not yet',and hiekh 'not at all'.

siai 'not, no' 

According to Næss, A., & Hovdhaugen, E. (2011) the colloquial pronunciation of  siai is hiai, however the standard written form is siai. 
Siai comes after preverbal arguments but is placed before the tense-aspect-mood particle and following clitic pronoun.

	

As in the case of auā modifying particles, which are traditionally found after verbs, may appear following siai. An example of this is loa which is an emphatic marker.

For example, siai loa.

A further example is the addition of po which generally serves to connect a complement clause.

sikiai, hikiai 'not yet' 

sikiai, hikiai (where sikiai is the formal written expression of spoken hikiai) appears in the same formation as above siai except it proceeds the preverbal argument and precedes any tense-aspect-mood markers. It appears less frequently and is often accompanied by the perfective marker ne.

hiekhī/hiekhiē 'not at all' 

This is the emphatic form of the negator. It follows the same distribution as both sia and sikiai and is often accompanied by the post-nuclear modifier loa.

As with siai  hiekhī appears in conjunction with complementiser po, although with lower frequency.

Non-verbal Clause Negation 

The same negators are used as in the verbal clauses above.

Questions

Polar Questions 

Polar questions are commonly formed in three ways. A declarative clause with a rise in intonation to mark the interrogative which requires the binary, 'yes' or 'no' response, much as they are in English may be used. The second alternative is the addition of the verbal negator (o) siai ‘(or) not'  and the third is the addition of verbal negator sikiai (not yet) if the interrogative has a temporal element.

Simple interrogative formed with declarative clause:

(o) siai

sikiai

Noun Phrase Negation

Negated Existence 

Non-specific article e can be used to express 'negated existence' unless the noun has a possessive marker in which case e is absent.

Spatial Deixis 
Spatial deixis is primarily expressed through demonstratives and directional forms in Vaeakau-Taumako. These spatial-deictic forms "allow the speaker to point to spatial locations" and encode the context of utterances or speech events. Interestingly, demonstrative and directional usage in Vaeakau-Taumako is particularly unique for a Polynesian language. This illustrates that spatial deixis is an especially important feature of Vaeakau-Taumako grammar. Demonstratives and directionals are discussed in more detail below.

Demonstratives 
Vaeakau-Taumako demonstratives comprise a three-term system which is summarised below:

Overall, these demonstratives have not only nominal and adverbial uses, but are also used in various capacities to structure discourse. The demonstrative particles also occur in more complex forms (see verbal demonstratives and deictic adverbs below).

Historical context 
Vaeakau-Taumako demonstratives have cognates in other Polynesian languages. These demonstratives are also consistent with what has been reconstructed for Proto-Polynesian and Proto-Oceanic. These linguistic reconstructions are summarised below: 

Furthermore, in the following discussion it will become evident that Boumma Fijian shares multiple linguistic traits with Vaeakau-Taumako. Therefore, it is possible that Boumma Fijian may be more closely related to Vaeakau-Taumako than other Polynesian languages.

Speaker-based system 
The Vaeakau-Taumako demonstrative system is speaker-based: the location of the hearer or speaker serves as reference point for where the relevant object is located. Denny summarised this succinctly in describing this system as one that centers space on the speaker or other participant. In Vaeakau-Taumako, 'ne(i)’ reflects an object’s proximity to the speaker, 'na' reflects an object’s proximity to the hearer and 'la' reflects distance from both the speaker and hearer, or a third party in the conversation.

This three-way distinction is so common in Oceanic languages that it is "virtually certain" that Proto-Oceanic also adopted a person-based demonstrative system. On a global scale, this three-way contrast is the second most common demonstrative system in the languages listed on The World Atlas of Linguistic Structures(WALS), with a two-way contrast being the most common system.

Vaeakau-Taumako's speaker-based system can be rationalised by the geographic context in which it is spoken. As the language is spoken on islands in the Solomon Islands, the speakers inhabit relatively small environments that do not have naturally defined reference points to describe space. To compensate for this, demonstratives are instead based on the speakers and hearers who are in the "immediate speech situation".

Distance-based system 
However, discourse analyses of current demonstrative usage indicates that the system may be shifting to one that is distance-based and therefore not dependent on the speech-act participants. This is summarised below:

'Na' is generally the preferred neutral choice of demonstrative to refer to an object that is neither far nor close. Therefore 'na' is not only used in direct conversations to illustrate proximity with a speech-participant (e.g. 'that one near you'), but it is also used in narratives as a medial term of a distance-based system. In these narrative contexts, 'na' refers to an object that is distance-neutral or medium-distance. This dual purpose of 'na' is not completely unique to Vaeakau-Taumako as Boumaa Fijian also adopts a "mixed" system.

Demonstrative pronouns 
Demonstratives in Vaeakau-Taumako can be used as heads of noun phrases that are comparable to the English phrases 'this one' and 'that one'. In this capacity, the demonstrative is often preceded by the articles 'te' (indicating singularity) or 'ngha' (indicating plurality). This is typical for a Polynesian language. The following example shows the demonstrative 'na' ('that'), being used in conjunction with the prefix 'te' to denote singularity:

 
Furthermore the following example shows the prefix 'ngha' attaching to the demonstrative 'la' ('those') to indicate plurality: 

Alternatively, the demonstratives can occur as a free-standing lexical item (i.e. without the need for preceding articles). This more unique aspect of Vaeakau-Taumako is exemplified in the following clause:

When acting as heads of nouns, the demonstratives may also be used anaphorically to refer to previously mentioned objects/participants in the conversation. The demonstratives can therefore serve the same purpose as a third-person pronoun (see Figure 4.4 below). Cross-linguistically this is not common, with the 100 of the 225 languages on WALS having language systems where third person pronouns are unrelated to demonstratives.

Demonstrative adjective 
Demonstratives also function to modify a noun phrase in Vaeakau-Taumako. They can be used with nouns or pronouns and can function as a deictic or anaphoric reference. The following example shows how the demonstrative 'na' ('that') is suffixed to the noun 'mhe' ('man') for a deictic purpose: 

This second example shows how the demonstrative 'ne' can be used as an anaphoric reference:

When a demonstrative is used with a pronoun, the demonstrative often (but not always) corresponds with the speech-act participant that is being referred to in the respective pronoun. Therefore 'ne' will be generally used with first person pronouns, 'na' will be used with second person pronouns and 'la' will be used with third person pronouns. However, 'na' can also be adopted as a neutral particle that is used interchangeably with third person and second person pronouns.

Local adverbial demonstratives 
Demonstratives in Vaeakau-Taumako also function as local adverbs that modify a verb and indicate the location in which the respective action occurs:

When being used in this adverbial capacity, the demonstratives also have temporal-deictic references to refer to time (i.e. 'now' and 'then'):

Verbal demonstratives 
In Vaeakau-Taumako, the formal class of adverbs is limited, so manner adverbial demonstratives with the meanings 'do/be like this, do/be like that' are regularly utilised. These verbal demonstratives are cross-linguistically rare, however Boumaa Fijian and Dyirbal also exhibit similar forms. For example, in Fijian 'eneii' functions like the verbal demonstratives in Vaeakau-Taumako. The Vaeakau-Taumako forms are created by attaching the prefix 'p(h)e' to the core demonstrative particles:

This first example shows the adverbial demonstrative 'phe-ne' being used to convey the meaning 'do like this':

Secondly, verbal demonstratives also function to mean 'be the same as, in the same way':

Thirdly, the verbal demonstratives can function as modifiers of nouns to mean 'an X like that' (Figure 7.4) or 'a certain X' (Figure 7.5):

This complex three-way distinction in which verbal demonstratives can be used is not only uncommon cross-linguistically, but it is also atypical among the languages which do have similar verbal demonstrative systems. Dyirbal and Boumaa Fijian only adopt a single verb to denote 'do it like this' in comparison to Vaeakau-Taumako's three-way system.

Deictic adverbs 
Vaeakau-Taumako also has deictic adverbs that are formed by applying the prefixes 'a-’, 'i-'or 'e-’ to the core demonstrative particles. These forms are summarised below:

It is worth noting that 'ena' ('somewhere there') appears to only have a spatial reference. Furthermore the usage of 'ena' seems restricted to colloquial contexts:

Demonstratives in discourse   
Demonstrative particles commonly occur at the end of phrases. This applies to a variety of phrase types, with the following examples illustrating how 'na' can occur phrase-finally in a noun phrase (Figure 9.1), a verb phrase (Figure 9.2) and an adverbial phrase (Figure 9.3):

Beyond deictic and anaphoric uses of demonstratives (which have been discussed above), another core use of demonstratives is for phrase demarcation. Demonstratives occur at the end of a phrase as a means of marking the phrase boundary and situating the phrase within the overarching context of the clause. In Vaeakau-Taumako, demonstratives are commonly used to indicate that there is a link between the demonstrative-marked phrase and the succeeding speech. It is often used in conjunction with rising intonation to indicate that "more is coming" (Figure 9.4 below). Similar demarcative particle morphemes are used in the Outlier East Futuna with the particle 'la'.

Directionals 
In addition to demonstratives, Vaeakau-Taumako also has a set of morphemes that indicate verbal deixis (i.e. the physical or metaphorical direction in which an action is being carried out). There are six morphemes which can be divided into two categories (Figure 1.1 and 1.2). The directionals are best described as verbs that are most commonly used as part of a verbal nucleus, following one or more verbs. The first category of Vaeakau-Taumako directionals is summarised below:

The following example shows 'mai' ('towards speaker') following another verb and marking the direction in space in which the act is occurring (i.e. towards the speech-act participants):

The second category of directionals is summarised below:

The following examples show 'iho' ('down') and 'oho' ('up or down') following another verb and marking the vertical direction in which the respective verb occurs:

Independent usage 
Directionals may also be used as independent verbs, with 'iho' and 'oho' being the most commonly used forms. When used as independent verbs, 'iho' means 'go down' (Figure 2.1) and 'oho' means 'move vertically; rise up; go down' (Figure 2.2):

Furthermore 'mai' can function as an independent verb to mean 'come' (Figure 2.3). This commonly occurs in imperative clauses, which is typically how cognates of 'mai' in related Polynesian languages are also used.

It is also interesting to note that 'mai' can not only encode a literal direction, but also a metaphorical 'social' direction. In the example below (Figure 2.4), 'mai' denotes 'towards me' in a metaphorical sense that is 'for me; for my benefit; on my behalf': 

Lastly 'atu' also functions an independent verb which means 'move out, go away'. This is shown in the below example (note: 'poi' is a prenuclear modifier that precedes verbs):

Historical context 
Vaeakau-Taumako directionals have cognates in most other Polynesian and Oceanic languages. The corresponding reconstructed forms in Proto-Oceanic were directional verbs that occurred either independently or in serialisation constructions with another verb. The reflexes of these forms occur in modern Oceanic languages in variety of formal word classes. For example, in Tuvaluan, 'mai' ('hither'), 'atu' ('thither'), 'aka' ('up') and 'ifo' ('down') have been classified as adverbs, while directionals are categorised as 'particles' in Somoan.

Abbreviations 
The abbreviations used in the above examples are listed below:

Grammatical glosses 
ADMON:admonitive mood
COMP:complementizer
GENR:general tense-aspect-mood
LDA:locative-directional-ablative
NSP:nonspecific
PRSC:prescriptive
SP:specific
TOP:topicalizing preposition

 ADMON admonitive
 AG agentive marker
 APPL applicative suffix
 BEN benefactive
 CAUS causative prefix
 CLASS classifier
 COL collective
 CONI conjunction
 COMP complementizer
 DEM demonstrative
 DES desiderative
 DIST distributive
 DU dual
 DY dyad particle
 EMPH emphatic particle
 EXCL exclusive
 FUT future
 GENR general tense-aspect -mood marker
 HORT hortative
 HYP hypothetical particle
 INCL inclusive
 INCEP inceptive
 INTI interjection
 IPFV imperfective
 IRR irrealis
 LDA locative-directional-ablative
 NEG negative
 NMLZ nominalizing suffix
 NSP nonspecific
 OBL.PRO oblique pro-forru
 OPT optative
 PERS personal marker
 PFV perfective
 PL plural
 POSS possessive
 PP predicative possessive particle
 PREF prefix; gloss uncertain
 PROH prohibitive
 PN pronoun
 PRSC prescriptive
 PST past
 RECP reciprocal
 RED reduplication
 SG singular
 SP specific
 TOP topicalizing preposition
 TR transitive suffix
 VOC vocative
 I 1st person
 2 2nd person
 3 3rd person

Lexical categories 
 adj adjective
 adv adverb
 gn geographical narue
 In local noun
 n, en corrnnon noun
 part particle
 pron pronoun
 prep prepos1t10n
 quant quantifier
 VI intransitive verb
 vsem semi-transitive verb
 vt transitive verb

Notes
 References from :

 Other sources

Bibliography
.
.

External links
Portions of the Anglican Book of Common Prayer in Pileni
Paradisec has a number of collections that include Vaeakau-Taumako language materials.

Ellicean languages
Languages of the Solomon Islands
Polynesian outliers